Conasprella scaripha is a species of sea snail, a marine gastropod mollusk in the family Conidae, the cone snails and their allies.

Like all species within the genus Conasprella, these cone snails are predatory and venomous. They are capable of "stinging" humans, therefore live ones should be handled carefully or not at all.

Description
The height of the shell attains 41 mm, its diameter 15 mm.

(Original description) The biconic shell is attenuated in front, slightly swelling in front of the shoulder, which is sharply carinate. The spire is low and consists of about eight whorls without the (lost) protoconch. The summit of the whorls between the suture and the carina is excavated and smooth. The walls of the shell are rather thin. The outer lip is nearly straight. The ground-color is yellowish white covered with a thin smooth yellowish periostracum. The pattern of fluctuating longitudinal streaks of yellowish brown, which by their zigzag direction and anastomosis leave roughly triangular patches of white of small size all over the shell, except in the middle, where a tendency to the usual paler girdle is manifest. Near the siphonal canal there are about sixteen paired prominent spiral threads, the intervals between the pairs being more or less channeled. The sutural sinus and the siphonal canal are rather deep.

Distribution
This marine species occurs in the Pacific Ocean off the Cocos (Keeling) Islands, Costa Rica at a depth of 121 m.

References

 Filmer R.M. (2001). A Catalogue of Nomenclature and Taxonomy in the Living Conidae 1758–1998. Backhuys Publishers, Leiden. 388pp.
 Tenorio M.J., Tucker J.K. & Chaney H.W. (2012) The families Conilithidae and Conidae. The cones of the Eastern Pacific. In: G.T. Poppe & K. Groh (eds), A conchological iconography. Hackenheim: Conchbooks.
 Puillandre N., Duda T.F., Meyer C., Olivera B.M. & Bouchet P. (2015). One, four or 100 genera? A new classification of the cone snails. Journal of Molluscan Studies. 81: 1–23

External links
 The Conus Biodiversity website
 

scaripha
Gastropods described in 1910